Paul Guers (19 December 1927 – 27 November 2016) was a French film actor. He appeared in 70 films between 1955 and 1996. He starred in the 1963 film Kali Yug: Goddess of Vengeance. He was born in Tours, France and died in Montsoreau.

Selected filmography

 Les chiffonniers d'Emmaüs (1955) - André
 Tower of Lust (1955) - Gaultier d'Aulnay
 Sophie et le Crime (1955) - Claude Broux
 If Paris Were Told to Us (1956) - Le comte de Villars (uncredited)
 The Twilight Girls (1957) - Gilles Mareuil
 Les violents (1957) - Philippe de Coppet
 Fumée blonde (1957) - David Baker
 A Tale of Two Cities (1958) - Charles Darnay
 Toto in Paris (1958) - Pierre, figlio di Duclos
 Marie-Octobre (1959) - Père Yves Le Guen
 I Spit on Your Grave (1959) - Stan Walker
  (1959) - French Ambassador D'Aurignac
 L'eau a la bouche (1960) - Jean-Paul Brett-Juval
 Sergeant X (1960) - Henri Mangin
 Une gueule comme la mienne (1960) - Paul Roy
 The Nabob Affair (1960) - Serge
  (1961) - Lucas Rimbaud
 Fuga desesperada (1961)
 Mourir d'amour (1961) - Michel Frank
 La fille aux yeux d'or (1961) - Henri Marsay
 Tales of Paris (1962) - Michel (segment "Françoise")
 Le Crime ne paie pas (1962) - Le docteur Mathieu (segment "L'affaire Fenayrou")
 Homage at Siesta Time (1962) - Henri Balmant
 Bay of Angels (1963) - Caron
 The Reunion (1963) - Livio
 Kali Yug: Goddess of Vengeance (1963) - Dr. Simon Palmer
 Il mistero del tempio indiano (1963) - Dr. Simon Palmer
 Le bluffeur (1964) - Frédo
 The Magnificent Cuckold (1964) - Gabriele
 Amore mio (1964) - Mario
 La fuga (1964) - Andrea Fabbri
 La Traite des blanches (1965) - Jean
 The Curse of Belphegor (1967) - Fred Daxo
 Un épais manteau de sang (1967) - Dyonis
 Flash Love (1968) - Alain
 Delphine (1969) - Norman
 Une femme libre (1971)
 Le feu aux lèvres (1973) - Michel Benoît
 Pourvu qu'on ait l'ivresse (1974) - Desgenais
 Les noces de porcelaine (1975) - Michel
 Vortex (1976)
 Libertés sexuelles (1977) - Alain
 The Maids of Wilko (1979) - Jola's Husband
 La mer couleur de larmes (1980) - Alain Vidal
 Notre histoire (1984) - Clark
 Three Seats for the 26th (1986) - Max Leehman
 Le parfum d'Yvonne (1994) - Daniel Hendrickx
 L'affaire (1994) - René Lantier
 Joséphine, ange gardien (1998, TV Series) - Pierre

References

External links

Actors from Tours, France
1927 births
2016 deaths
French male film actors
20th-century French male actors
French National Academy of Dramatic Arts alumni